Wolves At The Gate is an American post-hardcore and Christian metal band that originated from Cedarville, Ohio. Formed in 2008, they are currently signed to Solid State Records, where the band has released four EPs: We Are the Ones (2011), Back to School (2013), Reprise (2015), and Dawn (2020), five full-length albums: Captors (2012), VxV (2014), Types & Shadows (2016), Eclipse (2019), Eulogies (2022), and three Christmas singles over the years.

Background 

The band formed in 2008, and are from Cedarville, Ohio.

In 2009, the band released their debut demo EP, "Prisoner of War". None of these songs have ever been re-recorded for following albums and it is only available on YouTube and in part on the band's ReverbNation page. Drummer Ryan Connelly left shortly after its release. 

In 2010, the band recorded and released their EP "We Are the Ones". Since Conelly's departure, all drum parts were programmed by Cobucci. It was recorded in Engineer Tyler Smith's apartment in the back of a funeral home. After being signed to Solid State Records in September 2011, the EP was re-released on November 15 of that year, now with newly designed cover art, two bonus tracks, and a physical release exclusive to Hot Topic. 

The band released their debut studio album Captors on July 3, 2012, with Solid State. For the Billboard charting week of July 21, 2012, Captors charted at No. 7 on the Billboard Christian Albums chart, and at No. 17 on the Hard Rock Albums chart.

Their next album, VxV (pronounced: Five by Five), was released on June 10, 2014. The band released the song "Dust to Dust" on April 24, 2014. On May 12, 2015, the band released their third EP, Reprise, consisting of acoustic versions of songs from previous albums. The band's third album, Types & Shadows, was released on November 4, 2016.

Their fourth album, Eclipse, was announced on April 24, 2019, with a planned release date of July 26, 2019. At the same time, new band photos were released with a new member, Joey Alarcon joining in on guitars. They released its first single, "The Cure", on April 26, 2019. A second single, "A Voice in the Violence", was released on May 16, 2019. A third single, "Drifter", was premiered via Revolver Magazine on June 13, 2019.

On September 4, 2020, the band announced their fourth EP, Dawn, consisting of acoustic versions of songs off Eclipse, would be releasing October 9, 2020. That same day, the first single, an acoustic version of "A Voice in the Violence" was released and the second, "Counterfeit", was released on September 25, 2020.

In March 9, 2021, it was revealed that Tim Lambesis was working on a new side project with the band's guitarist Joey Alarcon. Lambesis had previously co-produced Eclipse alongside Alarcon and Steve Cobucci. In April 16, 2021, the band released a new single, "Stop The Bleeding", which was followed by another single, "Shadows", in October 15, 2021. After three more singles, "Deadweight", "Lights & Fire", and "Peace that Starts the War", were released, Wolves at the Gate issued their album Eulogies, on March 11, 2022. On November 18, 2022, the band released a Christmas EP, Lowborn, featuring two Christmas songs the band had released a decade prior, along with three newer cuts including the title cut which had been released as a single in 2021.

Band members 

Current
 Steve Cobucci – rhythm guitar, clean vocals (2008–present)
 Ben Summers – bass guitar, backing vocals (2008–present)
 Nick Detty – unclean vocals, piano (2012–present)
 Abishai Collingsworth – drums (2015–present)
 Joey Alarcon – lead guitar (2019–present)

Former
 Ryan Connelly – drums (2008)
 Dave Nester – drums (2008–2010)
 Colin Jones – unclean vocals (2008–2011)
 Jeremy Steckel – lead guitar (2008–2012)
 Ben Millhouse (Decyfer Down) – drums (2012–2013)
 Dylan Baxter – drums (2013–2015)

Timeline

Discography

Studio albums

Independent EPs

Studio EPs

Singles

Notes

References

External links 
 HM Magazine story

2008 establishments in Ohio
American Christian metal musical groups
Metalcore musical groups from Ohio
Christian rock groups from Ohio
Musical groups established in 2008
Musical quintets
Solid State Records artists
People from Cedarville, Ohio
Christian metal musical groups